The 2000–01 CBA season is the sixth CBA season.

The season ran from November 18, 2000 to March 18, 2001. Ji'nan Army and Shenyang Army were promoted from the Second Division.

Regular Season Standings

Playoffs 

The top 8 teams in the regular season advanced to the playoffs.

In the Final series, Bayi Rockets defeated Shanghai Sharks (3-1), and claimed its 6th straight CBA championship.

Teams in bold advanced to the next round. The numbers to the left of each team indicate the team's seeding in regular season, and the numbers to the right indicate the number of games the team won in that round. Home court advantage belongs to the team with the better regular season record; teams enjoying the home advantage are shown in italics.

Relegations
The bottom 4 teams played the relegation round by round-robin.

Ji'nan Army and Shenyang Army were relegated to the Second Division.

References

See also
Chinese Basketball Association

 
Chinese Basketball Association seasons
League
CBA